Tangivar (also Romanized as Tangīvar and Tangī Var; also known as Tang Gerāv, Tang-i-Garao, Tangūr, and Tang Var) is a village in Zhavehrud Rural District, in the Central District of Kamyaran County, Kurdistan Province, Iran. At the 2006 census, its population was 213, in 44 families. The village is populated by Kurds.

References 

Towns and villages in Kamyaran County
Kurdish settlements in Kurdistan Province